Jose ("Joe") Guevara (27 August 1917 – 2 December 2002) was a Filipino journalist, political commentator and art collector. Guevara was born in Tanauan, Batangas and earned his pre-law and law degrees at University of Santo Tomas, and later earned a master's degree in journalism from the same university. He began his career in journalism in 1938 as the editor-in-chief of The Varsitarian, the student newspaper at his university. He briefly worked as an attorney in the law office of Jose P. Laurel, who was later president of the Philippines, before returning to journalism.

From 1938 until his death in 2002, he wrote a popular political column titled "Point of View" for the Manila Bulletin, the Philippines' largest English-language daily newspaper. He was also a contributor to the Manila Times. On April 6, 1954, while reporting for the Manila Times at a legislative session, he introduced Imelda Romualdez to then-congressman Ferdinand Marcos, and a romance between the two developed rapidly. Guevara was described as Marcos's "steady sidekick", and spent a lot of time with the couple, reporting on their relationship which received a lot of attention from society columnists. The couple were married 11 days later. In 1991, he received an honorary doctorate from the Polytechnic University of the Philippines.

Guevara and his wife Nene also collected Filipino art for decades, accumulating works by many well-known artists, including Fernando Amorsolo, Ang Kiukok, Vicente Manansala, Guillermo Tolentino, Anita Magsaysay-Ho, Napoleon Abueva, Federico Aguilar Alcuaz, Botong Francisco, Eduardo Castrillo and Victorio Edades. Their extensive collection was auctioned off at the Léon Gallery in Makati in 2015.

References 

Commentators
 Filipino journalists
Collectors of Asian art
1917 births
2002 deaths
People from Tanauan, Batangas
University of Santo Tomas alumni
Manila Bulletin people
Writers from Batangas